Incantesimo (English translation: "Enchantment") is a long-running Italian drama series, originally broadcast on the RAI network from 1998 to 2008. It is mainly set in a hospital called Clinica Life in Rome, Italy, and revolves around the lives of the staff that works in it. It is known for having different lead actors who play a different story in almost every of its ten seasons.

Production and release
"Incantesimo" originally premiered in June 1998, on the Italian Rai 2 channel as an alternative prime time programming to the 1998 FIFA World Cup, which was running at the same time on Rai 1. The plot is written by popular Italian writer Maria Venturi. Gianni Lepre directed the series. The main characters are played by Agnese Nano, Vanni Corbellini and Giovanni Guidelli. The actress Daniela Poggi, who plays the malicious Cristina Ansaldi – one of the most notable characters – was personally called by Gianni Lepre to join the cast as he thought she's perfect for the role.

Surprisingly, the first season was very successful, attracting more than 4 million viewers during the broadcasting of its 10 episodes.

In Romania, the series was broadcast on TVR Timişoara

Main cast

 Agnese Nano: Barbara Nardi 
 Vanni Corbellini: Thomas Berger 
 Giovanni Guidelli: Roberto Ansaldi 
 Paola Pitagora: Giovanna Medici 
 Delia Boccardo: Tilly Nardi 
 Giuseppe Pambieri: Diego Olivares 
 Paolo Malco: Giuseppe Ansaldi 
 Daniela Poggi: Cristina Ansaldi 
 Linda Batista: Denise Nascimento  
 Guia Jelo: Costanza De Nittis 
 Ray Lovelock: Hans Rudolph  
 Warner Bentivegna: Emilio Dupré 
 Caterina Vertova: Myriam Santi 
 Kaspar Capparoni: Max Rudolph 
 Patrizia La Fonte: Olga Sciarra 
 Valentina Chico: Caterina Masi 
 Alessio Boni: Marco Oberon 
 Hélène Nardini: Rita Oberon
 Vanessa Gravina: Paola Dupré  
 Giorgio Borghetti: Michele Massa 
 Barbara Livi: Martina Morante 
 Lorenzo Flaherty: Andrea Bini 
 Antonia Liskova: Laura Gellini 
 Lorenzo Ciompi: Luca Biagi 
 Samuela Sardo: Giulia Donati 
 Walter Nudo: Antonio Corradi  
 Sonia Aquino: Rossella Natoli
 Alessandra Acciai: Cora Torrini  
 Paolo Lanza: Oscar Sensi  
 Orso Maria Guerrini: Ivano Nardi 
 Ramona Badescu: Sonya Laris 
 Nina Soldano: Luciana Galli 
 Angiola Baggi: Anna Danesi 
 Roberto Alpi: Giulio De Biase 
 Emilio Bonucci: Carlo Giudici
 Luigi Maria Burruano: Vittorio Ajello
 Micaela Esdra: Rosalba Baroni
 Elisabetta Pellini: Dori/Lara Baroni
 Anna Melato: Franca Melli
 Giampiero Bianchi: Guido Morante
 Marzia Ubaldi: Amalia Forti
 Stefania Casini: Carla Ferrini
 Nino Castelnuovo: Ernesto Longhi
 Mirca Viola: Luisa Donati 
 Laura Chiatti: Stella Loti
 Benedetta Massola: Ludovica Segre
 Carlotta Miti: Sara Segre 
 Ivana Monti: Liliana Donati 
 Giacomo Piperno: Renato Corradi
 Erika Blanc: Eleonora Loti
 Rodolfo Baldini: Cesare Gomez
 Luigi Diberti: Edoardo De Nittis 
 Eleonora Brigliadori: Viviana Costantini  
 Corinne Cléry: Viola Dessi 
 Paolo Ferrari: Luciano Mauri
 Ivo Garrani: Umberto Curti

References

RAI original programming
Italian medical television series
1998 Italian television series debuts
2008 Italian television series endings
1990s Italian drama television series
2000s Italian drama television series